Telefonica O2 UK Ltd v British Telecommunications plc [2014] UKSC 42 is a UK enterprise law, concerning telecommunications.

Facts 
Telefonica O2 UK Ltd argued that BT’s charges for connections and terminations were unlawful. BT’s Standard Interconnect Agreement was varied unilaterally in 2009 to change termination charges for 08 numbers, subject to a mobile operator’s right to object, and dispute resolution by Ofcom (unless both parties wanted something else). Under the new scheme, operators would be given charges varying by the amount the originating network charged to callers. If callers paid more, termination charges would go up. After Telefonica’s objection, Ofcom decided the changes would be allowed if ‘fair and reasonable’ as judged by three principles of (1) mobile network operators should recover costs of originating calls to relevant numbers (2) new charges should provide benefits to consumers, and not entail distortion of competition, and (3) new charges should be implemented as soon as practicable. Ofcom decided it was not shown that the new charges produced consumer benefits, and promote welfare, and so BT should not be allowed to introduce the new scheme.

The Competition Appeal Tribunal allowed BT to introduce the new scheme. The Court of Appeal stopped BT introducing the new scheme. BT appealed.

Judgment
Lord Sumption held that BT could introduce the new scheme. Ofcom rejected the scheme solely because of the welfare test, and it had not been shown BT's new charges would produce consumer benefits. BT was entitled by contract to vary charges, unless inconsistent with Directive 2002/21 art 8, which included a need to ensure consumer benefits. There was no finding of a lack of consumer benefit, so Ofcom could not reject charges just because they might have adverse consumer consequences, without any reason to think they would. They applied an extreme precautionary principle to a dynamic and competitive market, at odds with the Directives’ market-oriented and permissive approach.

Lord Neuberger, Lord Mance, Lord Toulson and Lord Hodge agreed.

See also

United Kingdom enterprise law
EU law

Notes

References

United Kingdom enterprise case law